Mantinae is a subfamily of praying mantids of the family Mantidae.  It was authored by Hermann Burmeister in 1838.

Tribes and genera
The Mantodea Species File now lists just three genera here, effectively in a single tribe:

Mantini
Mantilia - monotypic Mantilia ehrmanni Roy, 1993
Mantis (Linnaeus, 1758)
Statilia (Stal, 1877)

Tribes moved elsewhere
 Archimantini is now in the Hierodulinae
 Paramantini is now in the new subfamily Tenoderinae
 Polyspilotini is now Tenoderini in the Tenoderinae

References

External links
Tree of Life - Mantinae

.
Mantodea subfamilies